Dalnaspidal railway station served the burgh of Pitlochry, Perthshire, Scotland from 1864 to 1965 on the Inverness and Perth Junction Railway.

History 
The station opened in June 1864 by the Inverness and Perth Junction Railway. The station closed to both passengers and goods traffic on 3 May 1965.

References

External links 

Disused railway stations in Perth and Kinross
Railway stations in Great Britain opened in 1864
Railway stations in Great Britain closed in 1965
1864 establishments in Scotland
1965 disestablishments in Scotland
Beeching closures in Scotland
Former Highland Railway stations